William Albert Moore (14 October 1912 – 2002) was a Welsh amateur footballer who played in the Football League for Cardiff City as a left half. He was capped by Wales at amateur level.

References 

Welsh footballers
English Football League players
Wales amateur international footballers
Association football wing halves
1912 births
Sportspeople from Caerphilly County Borough
2002 deaths
Place of death missing
Cardiff City F.C. players